Alone in Paris (French: Seul dans Paris) is a 1951 French comedy drama film directed by Hervé Bromberger and starring Bourvil, Magali Noël, Georgette Anys and Yvette Etiévant.

It was shot at the Francoeur Studios in Paris and on location around the city. The film's sets were designed by the art director Eugène Delfau.

Synopsis
A couple from Normandy arrive in Paris to spend their honeymoon in the capital. However, separated on the Paris Metro they both experience a series of adventures in the city on the eve of the Bastille Day celebrations. Eventually the couple are reunited, much the wiser for their time in Paris.

Cast
 Bourvil as Henri Milliard
 Magali Noël as Jeanne 'Jeannette' Milliard née Duvernet
 Yvette Etiévant as Germaine
 Camille Guérini as Ernest Milliard
 Georges Baconnet as François Bouqueret
 Claire Olivier as Amélie Bouqueret
 Germaine Reuver as Mathilde
 Albert Rémy as Arthur
 Georgette Anys as La dame du métro
 Léonce Corne as Le patron du 'Bon Accueil'
 Jean Dunot as Auguste Duvernet
 Grégoire Gromoff as Un client de l'hôtel
 François Joux as Le 2ème employé du commissariat
 Denise Kerny as L'institutrice
 Christian Lude as Le Commissaire
 Marcel Meral as Le monsieur du commissariat
 Albert Michel as Le 1er employé du commissariat
 Léon Pauléon as L'homme du métro 
 Max Révol as L'employé de la consigne

References

Bibliography
 Siclier, Jacques. Le cinéma français: De la bataille du rail à la Chinoise, 1945-1968. Editions Ramsay, 1990.

External links

1951 films
Films set in Paris
Films shot in Paris
1950s French-language films
Films directed by Hervé Bromberger
French black-and-white films
French comedy-drama films
1951 comedy-drama films
Gaumont Film Company films
Films shot at Francoeur Studios
1950s French films